Dante's Equation is a novel  by American writer Jane Jensen, published in 2003. It was nominated for the Philip K. Dick Award and received a Special Citation for it.

Plot summary

The novel tells the discovery of many people, two of them physicists, that the fifth dimension obeys a (species of spiritual) law of nature where Good and Evil control the lower dimensions. This insight was first discovered by a Jewish physicist, Yosef Kobinski, who was interned in Auschwitz during the Holocaust. It is rediscovered by Dr. Jill Talcott and her graduate-student assistant. Talcott's discovery coincides with the resurfacing of manuscripts written by the Jewish physicist. The discovery and the manuscripts attract an interest from several sources. A kabbalistic scholar becomes interested in Kobinski as well, as his name shows up in an analysis of Torah codes. A journalist is trying to track down Kobiniski too as part of the research for an article on disappearances. The military become aware of the phenomenon as well, and one agent tries to track down the young scientist and her partner in order to evaluate the military applications of the discovery.

Characters
 Denton Wyle-- Reporter for the Mysterious World tabloid. Obsessed with disappearances: when he was 10 years old, his little friend, Molly, disappeared right in front of his eyes, but his parents believe that he drowned her. Because the Wyles are rich, there is no scandal; but Denton badly wants his mother and others to love him.
 Aharon Handalman-- Rabbi and Torah scholar in Jerusalem. Discovers Yosef Kobinski's name and ominous phrases in the Torah codes. Married to Hannah and a distant father to their three children.
 Calder Farris-- Lieutenant in the United States Army and agent for the United States Department of Defense, a violently patriotic sociopath investigating new weapons technology from non-mainstream scientific sources.
 Dr. Jill Talcott-- Physicist at the University of Washington studying wave theory, she is one of very few named female characters. Discovers the One-Minus-One Wave with assistant and graduate student Nate Andros. A hard-logic personality, nicknamed "Jill the Chill", she is skittish around men and constantly uses icy body language to rebuff Nate's interest in her.
 Nate Andros-- Graduate student and assistant to Dr. Talcott; has a bachelor's degree in Philosophy; he is in love with Jill Talcott and repeatedly risks his life to help her.
 Hannah Handalman-- Wife of Aharon; aids Aharon in his search for information about Kobinski, against his wishes. When he finally realizes how much he loves her, she will do anything for him. A mother of three, she is an opposite of Jill, who doesn't care for children or family, but the two become friends.
 Yosef Kobinski-- Physicist, Rabbi and Kabbalist. Imprisoned in Auschwitz during World War II. Several eyewitnesses testified that he and his deadly enemy, a Nazi camp guard, disappeared in a flash of light when many prisoners managed an escape from the concentration camp. Becomes semi-divine Lord of the sentient but violent and cannibalistic denizens of the adjacent-universe, heavy-gravity planet called Fiori.

Themes 
 One-Minus-One / One-Plus-One Wave - The equation for good and evil; more specifically, a wave that, when it overlaps with the gravity waves of matter and probability waves, works to alleviate negative happenings (troughs) and to blunt positive happenings (peaks). 
 Good and evil - Yosef Kobinski theorizes that the two are balanced in the Fifth Dimension and that they rule the multiverse in all places in which sentient life and morality can be understood by humans who visit there.
 Many-worlds interpretation - Jill Talcott, the physicist, is the last of the characters to believe that parallel worlds might exist; she learns otherwise when she and Nate (and the other main characters) use Kabbalistic physics to be sent to a parallel, futuristic planet.
 Kabbalah - An important set of esoteric teachings which drives some of the Jews in the novel and which eventually influences or affects all of the main characters.
 Unrequited love - Hannah Handalman loves her husband, who is too self-obsessed to understand her needs; Nate loves Jill, who is terrified of intimacy, although at times she expresses a returned lust.
 Cryptanalysis - Rabbi Aharon Handalman finds worrying evidence in the Torah that Kobinski might have created a terrifying new weapon; Calder Farris hopes very much to find that Kobinski did create one which could destroy all enemies of the United States.

Literary significance and reception 
Jeff Zaleski gave this novel a mixed review for Publishers Weekly: "Jensen is on surer ground describing Kabbalah and Holocaust history than she is plotting supernatural adventures, which unravel by the end. But she gets points for the innovative, multifaceted story". Frieda Murray was more positive in her review for Booklist: "The book plays out as it has begun, in rather standard thriller fashion. Jensen keeps it moving, though, and her characters, if not always sympathetic, are fully developed. In this, her second novel, she gives lessons in style to many thriller writers with longer publication lists". Kirkus Reviews was also somewhat mixed in their summary, describing the novel as "intriguing and often surprising, but what with a plot that doesn't add up and (with one exception) a nasty bunch of characters: mostly a tough slog".

Marian Kester Coombs in her review for Human Events was much more positive, saying, "the writing is felicitous--sometimes humorously colloquial, sometimes Virginia-Woolfish in the subtlety of its aperçus--and the momentum is energetic throughout (too often such heady plots lose steam and end up chugging wearily into the station for the obligatory finale). The wide range of believable (and mostly likable) characters remains alive and kicking. Jensen is particularly good at animating male characters, but her Dr. Jill Talcott is a memorable creation here".

Fiona Kelleghan gave the novel a rave review in The Washington Post, saying that Jensen writes "confidently and enthrallingly" and that the novel "deserves to take its place...in a Hugo nomination line-up": "Babe scientist Jill Talcott and her delightful lab assistant Nate stumble onto an equation with literally world-shaking implications, and their unexpected alliance with a playboy tabloid journalist and an Orthodox rabbi endangers all four and their murderous Department of Defense pursuer. Equally assured at mathematical speculation and kabbalistic cosmology, the novel is fast-paced, suspenseful, and a joy from beginning to end".

Victoria Strauss of the SF Site thought that the novel "has more the feel of a thriller than science fiction" but that "not so many thrillers, either, are as character-driven as this one. ... Fast-paced, suspenseful, and intellectually engaging, Dante's Equation is thoroughly enjoyable reading. Anyone who was tempted to hurl Dan Brown's wooden and overhyped The Da Vinci Code across the room might want to give this book a try; if you're looking for a well-written thriller full of religious symbology and exciting action, this is the real thing".

Jane Jensen described the book a critical and commercial disappointment.

See also

Tree of life (Kabbalah)
Biblical code
Dante Alighieri
Superweapon

Footnotes

External links

A more comprehensive review
Author's website

2003 American novels
2003 science fiction novels
American science fiction novels
Del Rey books